Dmitry Vasilievich Stasov (1828–1918) was a Russian lawyer who was a leading figure in the juridical reforms of the 1860s. He was the brother of the critic Vladimir Stasov and father of the Bolshevik revolutionary Elena Stasova.

Selected publications
 Muzykal'nye vospominaniya

References

Further reading
 Legkii, D.M. (2011) Dmitrii Vasil'evich Stasov: Sudebnaia reforma 1864 g. i formirovanie prisiazhnoi advokatury v rossiiskoi imperii. St. Petersburg: Dmitrii Bulanin.

External links 

1828 births
1918 deaths
Lawyers from Saint Petersburg
People from Sankt-Peterburgsky Uyezd